Marcel Felder and Caio Zampieri were the defending champions but they decided not to participate together.
Felder played alongside Máximo González, while Zampieri partnered up with Henrique Meloni.
Marcelo Demoliner and João Souza won the title, defeating Marcel Felder and Máximo González 6–1, 7–5 in the final.

Seeds

Draw

Draw

References
 Main Draw

Tetra Pak Tennis Cup - Doubles
2012 Doubles